Acrecebus is a prehistoric cebid monkey from the Late Miocene Solimões Formation of Acre State, Brazil and Bolivia. The only species known is 'A. fraileyi'. This genus is closely related to the genus Cebus.

References 

†Acrecebus
Prehistoric monkeys
Monotypic prehistoric primate genera
Prehistoric primate genera
Miocene primates of South America
Huayquerian
Chasicoan
Mayoan
Neogene Bolivia
Fossils of Bolivia
Neogene Brazil
Fossils of Brazil
Fossil taxa described in 2006